Chen Qingping or Ch'en Ch'ing-p'ing (1795–1868) was a 15th generation descendant and 7th generation master of the Chen Family. He is also claimed to be the 7th generation successor of the Zhaobao style of Taijiquan. Alternatively, many Zhaobao lineages (e.g. He Baoguo of the He family, Zhang Suisheng of Hulei) treat him as the progenitor of Taijiquan in Zhaobao. He was an influential martial artist and teacher of taijiquan (t'ai chi ch'uan). 
 
He was married to a woman from the Zhaobao village, only a few miles north east of the Chen Village (Chenjiagou) — the home of the Chen Family famous for their martial arts. He has also been said to have learned the small-frame (Xiaojia) Chen style developed by Chen Youben, and the striking similarity of Chen Style Xiaojia and Zhaobao Taijiquan supports this assertion like nothing else.

After touristic success of Chenjiagou in the early 21st century, many Zhaobao officials and some local teachers saw the commercial opportunity in distancing themselves from Chenjiagou and claiming the local Taijiquan style as “original” to attract western students and tourists in general to top up local budget. Naturally, Chen Qingping could not remain as the originator of Taijiquan in Zhaobao in such a new “history” and he started to be claimed a student of a local teacher in addition to his proficiency in Chen style. Inability to provide any academically-reputable proof of existence of any Taijiquan in Zhaobao predating Chen Qingping as well as the lineage records of many local teachers tracing the origin of their style back to Chen Qingping immediately disqualified those claims. Nevertheless, similarly to the Zhang Sanfeng fairytales, they are kept alive among less-academically oriented part of the taijiquan community, equally in China and the West. 

According to the apologists of this theory, after moving to the Zhaobao Village, Chen Qingping learned Zhaobao taijiquan from Zhang Yan, who was the 6th generation master of the Zhaobao Taijiquan lineage. Unfortunatelly, no proof of Zhang Yan’s relation to Taijiquan has ever been demonstrated.
 
Chen Qingping’s main disciple He Zhaoyuan passed on this art which later developed into He family Taijiquan. Another disciple, Li Jingyan, created the Hulei style Taijiquan by combining his art with other martial arts popular in the local area where he lived.

Chen Qingping is also credited as one of the teachers of Wu Yuxiang who later developed the Wu/Hao style taijiquan, sometimes referred to as the "Scholar-style of Taijiquan". Wu Yuxiang was recommended to Chen Qingping by Wu Yuxiang's primary teacher, Yang Luchan.

T'ai chi ch'uan lineage tree with Zhaobao focus

Notes

References
Wile, Douglas Lost T'ai-chi Classics from the late Ch'ing Dynasty (1996) State University of New York Press, Albany.

External links
 Chenstyle.com  - This resource guide to Chen and related styles has a description and short video of Zhaobao Jia.

Chinese tai chi practitioners
1868 deaths
1795 births
Sportspeople from Henan
People from Jiaozuo